The Hong Kong Cricket Sixes is a Six-a-side international cricket tournament held at the Kowloon Cricket Club comprising between eight and twelve teams. Organised by Cricket Hong Kong, it is sanctioned by the International Cricket Council. The tournament is designed for television viewing, with rules and a venue that encourage aggressive batting and high scoring. Because every player (except the wicket-keeper) is required to bowl one over, the format suits all-rounders.

All editions of the tournament have been held at the Kowloon Cricket Club except for the 1996 and 1997 editions which were held at the Hong Kong Stadium.

History 
In 2007, Sri Lanka defeated an All-Stars team (featuring players such as Shivnarine Chanderpaul and Shane Warne) to take the title.

The All-Stars returned for the 2008 event with West Indies batting great Brian Lara and New Zealand captain Stephen Fleming as members. They joined nine representative international teams in the tournament – defending champions Sri Lanka, Australia, Bangladesh, England, India, New Zealand, Pakistan, South Africa, and hosts Hong Kong.

The 2009 tournament, held from 31 October to 1 November, saw eight teams competing, with South Africa defeating Hong Kong in the final.

In 2011, the Hong Kong Cricket Association was awarded HK$3.5 million by the Hong Kong SAR government's Mega Event Fund (MEF) to organise the event, with added sponsorship from the KARP Group. To comply with the Mega Events Fund's objectives of promoting Hong Kong as an events capital in Asia, some changes were made to the format. 
These included expanding the tournament from two to three days, with tournament play starting on the Friday of the event weekend. The field was also increased from 8 to 12 teams with the addition of three more national teams and an invitational squad of international players.

The HKCA did not make another MEF application in 2012 due to time constraints, preferring instead to rely on a smaller grant through the government's 'M' Mark scheme. This resulted in a downscaled tournament played over two days on 27–28 October with eight teams (excluding the All-Stars side).

In 2013, the Hong Kong Cricket Association's applications for MEF contributions (at first HK$10 million then revised to HK$5 million) were turned down, leaving it with a budget of HK$1 million from the M-Mark scheme to organise the tournament. The association felt that a further HK$500,000 to HK$1 million would be needed to organise the tournament and cancelled it after not securing private sponsorship.

On 28 June 2017, Cricket Hong Kong announced that the Hong Kong Sixes will return on 28–29 October following a five-year absence, the event will take place at the Kowloon Cricket Club.

Match rules
The Laws of Cricket apply, except:
 Games are played between two teams of six players, and each game consists of a maximum of five six-ball overs bowled by each side (eight-ball overs in the final match).
 Each member of the fielding side bowls one over, with the exception of the wicket-keeper.
 Wides and no-balls count as two runs.
 If five wickets fall before 5 overs are completed, the last remaining batsman bats on with the fifth batsman acting as a runner. He always takes strike. The innings is complete when the sixth wicket falls.
 Batsmen retire not out on reaching 31 runs. The idea being to reach 36 runs by hitting 6 sixes. A retired batsman can return to the crease after lower-order batsmen either retire or are out.
 A tournament points system awards two points for each match won.

Past winners

Most Successful Teams

See also
 Short form cricket

References

External links
 Cricket Hong Kong Sixes homepage. Retrieved 12 February 2017

 
Annual sporting events in Hong Kong
International cricket competitions in Hong Kong
Short form cricket